Ɀ (lowercase: ɀ) is a Latin letter z with a "swash tail" (encoded by  Unicode, at codepoints U+2C7F for uppercase and U+0240 for lowercase) was used as a phonetic symbol by linguists studying African languages to represent a voiced labio-alveolar fricative.

In 1931, it was adopted into the orthography of Shona for a 'whistled' z, but it was dropped in 1955 due to the lack of the character on typewriters and fonts. Today the digraph zv is used.

It is sometimes used to transcribe Toda's /d̪z̪/.

Notes and references

See also
ȿ
ƍ
Ȥ "Z with hook"

Z
Z